Mark Kratzmann and Wally Masur were the defending champions but only Masur competed that year with Pat Cash.

Cash and Masur lost in the second round to Paul Annacone and David Wheaton.

Jeff Brown and Scott Melville won in the final 2–6, 7–5, 6–0 against Goran Ivanišević and Petr Korda.

Seeds
Champion seeds are indicated in bold text while text in italics indicates the round in which those seeds were eliminated. The top four seeded teams received byes into the second round.

Draw

Final

Top half

Bottom half

External links
 1990 Volvo International Doubles Draw

Doubles